Pt. Deen Dayal Upadhyaya Saraswati Vidya Mandir Inter College is an educational institution in Lakhimpur Kheri, Uttar Pradesh. The school is affiliated by Central Board of Secondary Education,  There is also one branch which is affiliated to  UP Board. This school was set up by veteran RSS leader Shri Vijay Agrawal ( पूर्व संयुक्त क्षेत्र कार्यवाह, (उत्तराखंड, उत्तरप्रदेेश). He himself was Retd Principal and Mathematics Lecturer. It was his dream project to start school of RSS ideology in his home district on the name of Veteran Jan Sangh leader and his RSS colleague Lt. Pt. Deen dayal Upadhyay Ji. At that time  he co-ordinated with then CM of UP Shri Rajnath Singh ji for government aid in construction of school.

Bhumi Pujan of this school was done by Mahant Shri Nritya GopalDas Ji. It was seen many times that on convocation day of school many high-profile personalities were invited as Chief Guest due to their strong relations with Shri Vijay Agrawal.From Current President (then Governor Bihar) Sri Ramanth Kovind Ji, Governor of UP Ram Naik Ji  to Deputy CM Dinesh Sharma Ji had been invited as Chief Guest.

External links
Details Of Affiliation
Icbse link of school

• 

Intermediate colleges in Uttar Pradesh
Education in Lakhimpur, Uttar Pradesh
Educational institutions established in 2007
2007 establishments in Uttar Pradesh